Parliamentary committees of the Australian House of Representatives are groups of Members of Parliament, appointed by the House of Representatives, to undertake certain specified tasks. They comprise government and non-government Members and have considerable powers to undertake work on behalf of the Parliament.

Federation Chamber

The Federation Chamber, formerly the Main Committee, provides an additional forum for the second reading and consideration in detail stages of bills and debate of committee reports and papers presented to the House. All Members of the House are automatically members of the Federation Chamber and eligible to participate in its meetings.

Standing committees 
Under the Standing Orders of the House, standing committees are appointed for the life of the Parliament and they are usually re-established in some form in successive Parliaments (that is, after each election).

The House has two types of standing committees:

 general purpose committees — established to inquire into and report upon any matters referred to them, including legislation. These committees specialise by subject area, between them covering most areas of policy and government administration.
 domestic or internal committees — concerned with the powers and procedures of the House or the administration of Parliament.

Select committees 
Select committees are appointed as the need arises for a specific purpose, and have a limited life.

Joint committees 
Joint committees are established by both Houses of the Australian parliament and include both Members and Senators. An example of this is the Joint Standing Committee on Northern Australia, appointed by resolution by the House of Representatives on 4 July 2019 and the Senate on 22 July 2019. The Inquiry into the destruction of 46,000-year-old caves at the Juukan Gorge in the Pilbara region of Western Australia was referred to this Committee in June 2020.

List of House and Joint committees of the 45th Parliament

See also
 Australian Senate committees
 Ministerial Committee

References

External links
 Official website of the Australian House of Representatives

House of Representatives committees, Australian
Australian House of Representatives